Kadugli Airport  is an airport serving Kadugli (also spelled Kaduqli), the capital city of the state of South Kurdufan (or South Kordofan) in Sudan.

Facilities

Kadugli Air Base

The airport hosts Sudanese Air Force Helicopter Squadron (Mil Mi-8, Mil Mi-24, Mil Mi-35).

Incidents
On 10 November 1979, Douglas C-47B ST-AHH of the National Agriculture Organisation crashed at Kadugli Airport and was destroyed by the subsequent fire.

References

External links
 

Airports in Sudan
South Kordofan